Tallman Mountain State Park is a  state park in Rockland County, New York, located adjacent to the Hudson River in the Town of Orangetown just south of Piermont. It is part of the Palisades Interstate Park System.

History
Tallman Mountain State Park was formed in 1928 after the Palisades Interstate Park Commission moved to condemn the  property of a quarry operator in an effort to preserve a portion of the Hudson River Palisades. Park facilities were improved in 1933 by Temporary Emergency Relief Administration workers, who constructed a swimming pool, recreation fields, and picnic areas.

Description
Tallman Mountain State Park is a day-use only park containing  of hiking trails, including sections of the Long Path and the Tallman Mountain Bike Path.  The park also offers a running track, tennis courts, playing fields, cross-country skiing, and picnic areas. For an additional fee, visitors may also use a pool complex within the park, operated by a private vendor under an agreement with the Palisades Interstate Park Commission since summer 2016.

The park includes part of Piermont Marsh, which is included in the Hudson River National Estuarine Research Reserve.

See also
List of New York state parks

References

External links
 New York State Parks: Tallman Mountain State Park
 New York-New Jersey Trail Conference: Tallman Mountain State Park details and trail information
 U.S. Geological Survey Map at the U.S. Geological Survey Map Website. Retrieved January 31, 2023.

Palisades Interstate Park system
U.S. Route 9W
Parks on the Hudson River
Parks in Rockland County, New York
State parks of New York (state)